Paul W. Sullivan (born April 17, 1941) is an American former professional tennis player.

Tennis career
Sullivan was raised in Belmont, Massachusetts and captained Harvard University in varsity tennis.

Active on tour during the 1960s and 1970s, Sullivan ranked as high as 19th nationally and featured regularly at the US Open, reaching the singles third round in 1965.

In 1994 he was inducted into the USTA-New England Hall of Fame.

Personal life
Sullivan married tennis player Jeannine Balbiers, whose father Ricardo was a Chilean Davis Cup player.

References

External links
 
 

1941 births
Living people
American male tennis players
Harvard Crimson men's tennis players
Tennis people from Massachusetts
People from Belmont, Massachusetts